The Fine Art of Invisible Detection is a 2021 mystery crime thriller novel by Robert Goddard.

Promotion 
The book was featured on the BBC talk show Between the Covers.

References 

2021 British novels
British mystery novels
British thriller novels
Hodder & Stoughton books